Alessandro nelle Indie (Alexander in India) is an opera seria in two acts by Giovanni Pacini to a libretto by Andrea Leone Tottola and Giovanni Schmidt, based on Alessandro nell'Indie by Pietro Metastasio. It was premiered at the Teatro di San Carlo in Naples on 29 September 1824, and had a total of 38 performances in its first season.

This opera is one of some 70 operatic works using Metastasio's text about Alexander the Great, most of which were written in the 18th century, starting with the work by Leonardo Vinci (1730).

Roles

Recording
2006: Laura Claycomb (Cleofide), Jennifer Larmore (Poro), Bruce Ford (tenor) (Alessandro Magno), Mark Wilde (Gandarte), Dean Robinson (Timagene); Geoffrey Mitchell Choir, London Philharmonic, David Parry (conductor). Recorded November 2006 at Henry Wood Hall, London. Label: Opera Rara ORC35

References

Further reading
Balthazar, Scott L., "Alessandro nelle Indie", Grove Dictionary of Music and Musicians, ed. L. Macy.
Balthazar, Scott L. (with Michael Rose) (1997), "Giovanni Pacini", in Sadie, Stanley (ed.), The New Grove Dictionary of Opera, New York: Grove (Oxford University Press), Vol. Three, pp. 808—812. 
Marinelli-Roscioni, Carlo, Il Teatro di San Carlo La Cronologia 1737–1987, p. 191

External links

Operas
Opera seria
Italian-language operas
Operas by Giovanni Pacini
1824 operas
Opera world premieres at the Teatro San Carlo
Operas set in India
Cultural depictions of Alexander the Great
Libretti by Andrea Leone Tottola